David Raziel (19 November 1910 – 20 May 1941) was a leader of the Zionist underground in British Mandatory Palestine and one of the founders of the Irgun.

Biography
David Rozenson (later Raziel) was born in Smarhon’ in the Russian Empire. In 1914, when he was three, his family immigrated to Ottoman Palestine, where his father taught at Tachkemoni, a religious school in Tel Aviv. During World War I, the family was exiled to Egypt by the Turks due to their Russian citizenship. They returned to Mandatory Palestine in 1923.

After graduation from Tachkemoni, he studied for several years at Yeshivat Mercaz HaRav in Jerusalem. He was a regular study partner of Rabbi Zvi Yehuda Kook, son and ideological successor to the Rosh Yeshiva and Chief Rabbi of Israel, Rabbi Abraham Isaac Kook.

When the 1929 Hebron massacre broke out, he joined the Haganah in Jerusalem, where he was studying philosophy and mathematics at the Hebrew University of Jerusalem.

His sister, Esther Raziel-Naor, became a member of the Knesset for Herut, the party founded by Irgun leader Menachem Begin.

Military career
When the Irgun was established, he was one of its first members. In 1937 he was appointed by the Irgun as the first Commander of Jerusalem District and a year later, Commander in Chief of the Irgun. His term as leader was  marked by violence against Arabs, including a sequence of marketplace bombings. Most of those attacks were in response to Arab violence. Raziel worked with Avraham Stern, Hanoch Kalai, and Efraim Ilin.

After the coup of April 1941, British called on assistance from the Irgun, after General Percival Wavell had one of their commanders, David, released from his imprisonment in Palestine. They asked him if he would undertake to kill or kidnap Amin al-Husseini, the Mufti, and destroy Iraq's oil refineries. Raziel agreed on condition he be allowed to kidnap the Mufti. On 17 May 1941 he was sent to Iraq with three of his comrades, including Ya'akov Meridor and Jacob Sika Aharoni, on behalf of the British army to help defeat the Rashid Ali al-Gaylani pro-Axis revolt in the Anglo-Iraqi War. On 20 May a Luftwaffe plane strafed the car in which he was travelling near Habbaniyah, killing him and a British officer. Meridor returned to Palestine and took over command of the Irgun, while Jacob Sika Aharoni commanded the life-risking mission that lead to the British entry to Iraq and the saving of the Jewish community during the Farhud.

In 1955 his remains were exhumed and transferred to Cyprus, and again in 1961 to Jerusalem's Mount Herzl military cemetery.

Commemoration
Ramat Raziel, a moshav in the Judaean Mountains, is named after Raziel, as well as many streets in Israel bearing his name in commemoration. The Israel postal service issued a stamp in his honor. There is a high-school in Herzliya named after him.

References

Further reading
 Daniel Levine: The Birth of the Irgun Zvai Leumi. Jerusalem: Gefen Publishing House Ltd., 1991. .

1910 births
1941 deaths
People from Smarhon’
People from Vilna Governorate
Belarusian Jews
Emigrants from the Russian Empire to the Ottoman Empire
Jews in Mandatory Palestine
Mercaz HaRav alumni
Israeli military personnel
Irgun members
Military personnel killed in World War II
Burials at Mount Herzl
Yishuv during World War II
Mandatory Palestine military personnel of World War II
Deaths by airstrike during World War II